Angel is an American television series, a spin-off from the television series Buffy the Vampire Slayer which aired on The WB. The series was created by Buffy'''s creator, Joss Whedon, in collaboration with David Greenwalt, and first aired on October 5, 1999. It concluded on May 19, 2004, after five seasons with 110 episodes in total, plus an unaired pitch tape that was used to sell the series. The series continued in comic book form in Angel: After the Fall, Season 9, Season 10, Season 11, and concluded with Season 12.

In the United Kingdom, the series aired first on Sky1, and then, considerably later, on Channel 4 and, later, on Five.

All five seasons of the series are available as individual DVD box sets and as a complete series collection in Regions 1, 2 and 4.

Series overview

Episodes
 Season 1 (1999–2000) 

 Season 2 (2000–2001) 

 Season 3 (2001–2002) 

 Season 4 (2002–2003) 

 Season 5 (2003–2004) 

 Ratings 

 References 

See also
 List of Angel characters
 Angel DVDs
 List of Buffy the Vampire Slayer episodes
 Angel: After the Fall''

External links
 

 
Lists of American horror-supernatural television series episodes
Lists of American comedy-drama television series episodes
Lists of American fantasy television series episodes